Benn Olson (born April 29, 1987) is a Canadian professional ice hockey player who is currently playing for the Coventry Blaze in the Elite Ice Hockey League.

Career

Olson has so far played extensively in the minor leagues, bouncing back and forth between the ECHL and AHL in each of his 4 seasons as a professional. His post-season experience has been entirely in the ECHL, once with the Florida Everblades in 2010 and once with the Ontario Reign in 2012. Other teams Olson has played for include the Houston Aeros, Bridgeport Sound Tigers, Milwaukee Admirals, and Albany River Rats of the AHL, and the Cincinnati Cyclones and Alaska Aces of the ECHL.  Olson played juniors in the WHL, for the Kamloops Blazers and the Seattle Thunderbirds.

Olson's role as a defenseman has led him into the position of an enforcer; he has amassed 723 penalty minutes in 203 professional games, and 835 in his days in the WHL over 275 games.

References

External links

1987 births
Alaska Aces (ECHL) players
Albany River Rats players
Bridgeport Sound Tigers players
Canadian ice hockey defencemen
Cincinnati Cyclones (ECHL) players
Florida Everblades players
Houston Aeros (1994–2013) players
Kamloops Blazers players
Living people
Milwaukee Admirals players
Ontario Reign (ECHL) players
Seattle Thunderbirds players